John Joseph O'Brien (February 5, 1873 – June 10, 1933) was an outfielder in Major League Baseball. A native of Watervliet, New York, he batted left-handed and threw right-handed.

O'Brien spent part of two seasons with the Washington teams and Cleveland before moving to Boston. His most productive season came in 1899 as a rookie, he posted hit .282 and reached career-highs in home runs (6), RBI (51), runs (68), stolen bases (17) and games played (127). But he is best remembered as the first player to pinch-hit in a World Series game, when he struck out for Boston catcher Lou Criger in the 9th inning of Game One of the 1903 series against Pittsburgh. What O'Brien was unique in the true meaning of the word, and had the chance of remaining so forever despite his brief and undistinguished career. He was a .259 hitter in 326 games, including nine home runs with 133 RBI and 171 runs.

O'Brien died his homeland of Watervliet at the age of 60.

External links

Jack O'Brien - Baseballbiography.com

Boston Americans players
Cleveland Blues (1901) players
Washington Senators (1901–1960) players
Washington Senators (1891–1899) players
Major League Baseball infielders
Major League Baseball outfielders
19th-century baseball players
Baseball players from New York (state)
People from Watervliet, New York
1873 births
1933 deaths
Rochester Browns players
Troy Trojans (minor league) players
Rochester Blackbirds players
Scranton Miners players
Scranton Red Sox players
Syracuse Stars (minor league baseball) players
Kansas City Blues (baseball) players
Marion Glass Blowers players
Milwaukee Creams players
Newark Sailors players
Milwaukee Brewers (minor league) players
Burials at St. Agnes Cemetery